John Holland (7 April 1869 Acton, Cheshire, England - 22 August 1914 Bury, Lancashire, England) was a cricketer who played first-class cricket for Leicestershire and Lancashire between 1894 and 1902.

References

1869 births
1914 deaths
People from Nantwich
English cricketers
Leicestershire cricketers
Lancashire cricketers
Cheshire cricketers
Cricketers from Cheshire